The Chisolm Massacre occurred on April 29, 1877 in Kemper County, Mississippi, less than a month after the Reconstruction era was brought to a close. A judge and former sheriff named William Chisolm was accused of killing sheriff John Gully, a member of the Democratic Party, and was being held in the local jail. Also held there in protective custody were Chisolm's son, daughter, and two of his friends. A mob of around 300 Ku Klux Klan members stormed the jail and killed Chisolm, his family, and one of his friends. No one was convicted for the attack.

According to the Yorkville Enquirer, Chisolm was a Republican Party candidate for a seat in the U.S. Congress.

Southern papers applauded the lynching. The Yorkville Enquirer concluded its report on the "Tragedy in Mississippi" noting that: "Other hangings will probably follow." Governor John Marshall Stone refused to launch an investigation and U.S. President Rutherford Hayes did not comment on the killings. It was one of several reprisal actions in Mississippi during the period after Reconstruction. A freedman later confessed to killing Gully and was hanged.

The New York Times wrote about it. James Monroe Wells, a deputy revenue collector and U.S. Army veteran, wrote the book The Chisolm Massacre: A Picture of "Home Rule" in Mississippi about it. His criticisms of locals were responded to by James Daniel Lynch's account blaming Radical Republicans, Kemper County Vindicated, And a Peep at Radical Rule in Mississippi.

References

Family murders
Reconstruction Era
1877 in Mississippi
Lynching deaths in Mississippi